People, Places and Things is a play by the British playwright Duncan Macmillan. The inaugural production was directed by Jeremy Herrin and staged at the National Theatre in London in 2015. The play was widely praised by critics for its depiction of addiction, and Denise Gough, in the central role, won the Critics Circle Theatre Award for Best Actress. The production transferred to Wyndham's Theatre in 2016. Denise Gough won the Olivier Award for Best Actress for her role.

Awards and nominations

References

English plays
2015 plays